The Buchenbach is a river in Baden-Württemberg, Germany. It passes through Winnenden and flows into the Murr near Burgstetten.

See also
List of rivers of Baden-Württemberg

References

Rivers of Baden-Württemberg
Rivers of Germany